Vladimir Mićović (Serbian Cyrillic: Владимир Мићовић; born October 11, 1975) is a Serbian former football goalkeeper and current goalkeeping coach of Neftchi Baku.

In May 2014 Mićović rejoined his old club Neftchi Baku as a goalkeeping coach.

References

External sources
 Profile and stats until 2003 at Dekisa.Tripod.

1975 births
Living people
Serbian footballers
Serbian expatriate footballers
Red Star Belgrade footballers
FK Budućnost Banatski Dvor players
SC Tavriya Simferopol players
Expatriate footballers in Ukraine
Pas players
FK Balkan Mirijevo players
Ukrainian Premier League players
Expatriate footballers in Azerbaijan
Expatriate footballers in Iran
Association football goalkeepers
Neftçi PFK players
People from Aranđelovac